Biju Pappan (born 9 March 1969), is a Malayalam actor, his career began in movies in 1991 and continued both in television and films. He is well known for his anti-hero roles in Naran and Kayyoppu, which were financial successes. He has also appeared in over forty-five films, including box office successes like Chinthamani Kolacase, Achuvinte Amma, etc.

Early life (1969-90) 

Biju Pappan was born in Kannanmoola, Thiruvananthapuram district, to Late M. P. Padmanabhan, an outstanding Mayor of Thiruvananthapuram Corporation, and M. S. Kumari. He attended the St. Marys school and later enrolled in the junior technical School Nedumangadu. He attended Sree Narayana Polytechnic in Kottiyam for his diploma in Civil Engineering.

He was elected as the General Secretary, cine arts club secretary and sports general secretary of the college. He was an inter-poly champion in all throwing events. During the college days, he was closely associated with cultural events that inspired him to the world of art and movies.

Personal life 

Marriage and family: Biju Pappan married Sheeba on 15 January 1998 and had two sons: Karthik mb and Krishna mb.

Father: Late Comrade M. P. Padmanabhan, belongs to Mudumbil family, was the legendary councilor for 35 years till his death, who was the five time Mayor of Trivandrum city in different years. He is considered as one of the pioneer communist leaders in Kerala; he actively participated in theater arts along with Mr. Madhu, a legendary Malayalam actor.

Mother: M. S. Kumari, housewife.

Brother: M. P. Saju, a Known Politician and Advocate.

Brother: M. P. Baiju, Businessman, stationed at Middle east.

Sister: Siji

Early years (1991-2000) 

Biju Pappan's first film was Samooham (1991) By Satyan Anthikkadu, a successful film maker. His breakthrough in television serials happened when his characters in Valsalyam, Thaali, Vava, Kavyanjali and Sthree Oru Santwanam were widely addressed among Malayalam channel viewers as popular hit episodes.

Filmography 

All films are in Malayalam language unless otherwise noted.

References

External links
 
 
 Biju Pappan at MSI

Male actors from Thiruvananthapuram
Living people
1969 births
Male actors in Malayalam cinema
Indian male film actors
20th-century Indian male actors
21st-century Indian male actors